Kamallı or Kemally or Kyamally or Kayamally may refer to:
 Kamallı, Lachin, Azerbaijan
 Kamallı, Saatly, Azerbaijan